Zoltán Majó or Zoltán Majó-Petri (born 15 December 1970) is a Hungarian economist. He is associate professor (docent, reader), former director-general for Economic and Technological Affairs of the University of Szeged and acting director of Szeged Transport Ltd.

Early life
Majó was born on 15 December 1970 at Pitvaros, Makó District, Csongrád County, Hungary.

He graduated from Attila József University, Szeged in 1999. He completed his PhD degree in economics in 2008.

Career 
He joined the Institute of Business Studies, Faculty of Economics,  University of Szeged upon graduation. He started as a senior lecturer and later became an associate professor (docent, reader).

He was awarded a fellowship to e-HRM research group, University of Twente of Enschede, Netherlands in 2006.

From 2011 until 2014 he served as Director-General for Economic and Technological Affairs of the University of Szeged. in 2016 he became an acting director of the Szeged Transport Ltd.

Committee Memberships
John von Neumann Computer science Society, member
Public Body of the Hungarian Academy of Sciences (HAS), member

Awards and honors
Knight's Crosses of the Order of Merit of the Republic of Hungary (2010)

Selected works
His works include:

Papers
His papers include:

J Poór, S Kosár, P Fodor, V Tóth, Zoltán Majó, Z Csiba, E Huszárik: The impact of the crisis and recovery on HR and knowledge management in focus-a Hungarian-Slovakian comparison 2009, Periodica Polytechnica Social and Management Sciences 20 (1), 29–44, 2012.
Zoltán Majó-Petri, K Kazár: The MOOC business model: The e-Business and autonomous work inflection point in higher education?Journal Association 1901 SEPIKE http://www.sepikecloud.com/ 2016 (14), 102–109, 2016.
J Poor, A Bencsik, I Fekete, G Laszlo, Zoltán Majo: Trends and Tendencies in the Field of Improving the HR-Systems of Hungarian Public Universities, Revista De Management Company International/Review of International, 2009.

Books
Majó, Zoltán – Dinya, L. – Imreh, Sz.- (2008): Menedzsment II. (Management). A sikeres vállalkozások. Távoktatási tananyag. SZTE GTK, Szeged.
Imreh, Sz. – Kürtösi, Zs. – Majó, Zoltán – Vilmányi, M (2007): A menedzsment alapjai. (Introdcing to Management). Távoktatási Tananyag. SZTE GTK, Szeged.

References

External links
 
 

1970 births
Academic staff of the University of Szeged
Hungarian economists
Living people